Yayoiacmea is a genus of sea snails, the true limpets, marine gastropod mollusks in the family Lottiidae.

Species
Species within the genus Yayoiacmea include:
 Yayoiacmea oyamai (Habe, 1955)

References

Lottiidae
Monotypic gastropod genera